Unn is a Municipality city in Surat district in the Indian state of Gujarat. The city comes under Surat Metropolitan Region.

Geography
Unn is located at an average elevation of 17 metres (131 feet).

Demographics
 India census, Unn had a population of 28,761. Males constitute 65% of the population and females 35%. Unn has an average literacy rate of 69%, higher than the national average of 59.5%: male literacy is 76%, and female literacy is 56%. In Unn, 14% of the population is under 6 years of age.

See also 
List of tourist attractions in Surat

References

Suburban area of Surat
Cities and towns in Surat district